Szymon Sobel (born November 22, 2001), known professionally as Sobel, is a Polish pop and hip-hop singer, songwriter, composer and music producer.

He gained popularity after the release of the single "Impreza", which was certified for a diamond record. He repeated his success in 2020 with the single "Daj mi znać" recorded with Michał Szczygieł and the solo track "Fiołkowe pole" released in 2021. He was nominated for the Fryderyk 2021 Music Award in the Phonographic Debut of the Year category. The rapper has released one album Pułapka na motyle in 2021 and a mini-album Kontrast in 2020.

Discography 

 Kontrast (2020)
 Pułapka na motyle (2021)

References 

2001 births
Polish singers
Polish rappers
Living people
People from Świdnica